Benjamin "Bibi" Netanyahu (born 21 October 1949) is an Israeli politician who has been serving as the prime minister of Israel since December 2022, having previously held the office from 1996 to 1999 and again from 2009 to 2021. He is the chairman of the Likud party. Netanyahu is the longest-tenured prime minister in the country's history, having served for a total of over 15 years. He is also the first prime minister to be born in Israel after its Declaration of Independence.

Born in Tel Aviv to secular Jewish parents, Netanyahu was raised both in Jerusalem, and for a time in Philadelphia, Pennsylvania, in the United States. He returned to Israel in 1967 to join the Israel Defense Forces. He became a team leader in the Sayeret Matkal special forces and took part in several missions, achieving the rank of captain before being honorably discharged. After graduating from the Massachusetts Institute of Technology, Netanyahu became an economic consultant for the Boston Consulting Group. He moved back to Israel in 1978 to found the Yonatan Netanyahu Anti-Terror Institute. From 1984–1988, Netanyahu was Permanent Representative of Israel to the United Nations. Netanyahu rose to prominence after being elected as the chairman of Likud in 1993, becoming Leader of the Opposition. In the 1996 election, Netanyahu beat Shimon Peres, becoming the first Israeli prime minister elected directly by popular vote, and its youngest-ever. Netanyahu and Likud were heavily defeated in the 1999 election by Ehud Barak's One Israel party; and Netanyahu chose to retire from politics entirely, entering the private sector. Netanyahu later returned to politics, and served as Minister of Foreign Affairs and Minister of Finance under Ariel Sharon. During the latter position, he initiated reforms of the Israeli economy that led to significant growth, before ultimately resigning over disagreements regarding the Gaza disengagement plan. 

Netanyahu returned to the leadership of Likud in December 2005 after Sharon stepped down to form a new party, Kadima. He was the Leader of the Opposition from 2006 to 2009. After the 2009 election, Netanyahu formed a coalition government with other right-wing parties and was sworn in as prime minister for a second time. He went on to lead Likud to victory in the 2013 and 2015 elections. A period of political deadlock ensued after three consecutive elections in 2019 and 2020 failed to produce a government, which was solved after a coalition rotation agreement was reached between Netanyahu and centrist Blue and White alliance's Benny Gantz. The coalition collapsed In December 2020, before the rotation could take place, and a new election was held in March 2021. In his penultimate government, Netanyahu led Israel's response to the COVID-19 pandemic and the 2021 Israel–Palestine crisis. In June 2021, after Naftali Bennett formed a government with Yair Lapid, Netanyahu was removed from the premiership, becoming opposition leader for the third time, before returning as Prime Minister again after the 2022 election.

Netanyahu made his closeness to Donald Trump, a personal friend since the 1980s, central to his political appeal in Israel from 2016. During Trump's presidency, the United States recognized Jerusalem as the capital of Israel, recognized Israeli sovereignty over the Golan Heights, and brokered the Abraham Accords, a series of normalization agreements between Israel and various Arab states. Netanyahu has faced international criticism over his decades-long policy as prime minister of expanding Israeli settlements in the occupied West Bank, deemed illegal under international law. In 2019, Netanyahu was indicted on charges of breach of trust, bribery and fraud, following a three year investigation, due to which he relinquished all his ministry posts other than the prime minister position.

Early life and military career 

Netanyahu was born in 1949 in Tel Aviv. His mother, Tzila Segal (1912–2000), was born in Petah Tikva in the Ottoman Empire's Mutasarrifate of Jerusalem, and his father, Warsaw-born Benzion Netanyahu (né Mileikowsky; 1910–2012), was a historian specializing in the Jewish Golden age of Spain. Netanyahu's paternal grandfather, Nathan Mileikowsky, was a rabbi and Zionist writer. When Netanyahu's father emigrated to Israel, he hebraized his surname from "Mileikowsky" to "Netanyahu", meaning "God has given." While his family is predominantly Ashkenazi, he has said that a DNA test revealed him to have some Sephardic ancestry. He claims descent from the Vilna Gaon.

Netanyahu was the second of three children. He was initially raised and educated in Jerusalem, where he attended Henrietta Szold Elementary School. A copy of his evaluation from his 6th grade teacher Ruth Rubenstein indicated that Netanyahu was courteous, polite, and helpful; that his work was "responsible and punctual"; and that he was friendly, disciplined, cheerful, brave, active, and obedient.

Between 1956 and 1958, and again from 1963 to 1967, his family lived in the United States in Cheltenham Township, Pennsylvania, a suburb of Philadelphia, while father Benzion Netanyahu taught at Dropsie College.
Benjamin attended and graduated from Cheltenham High School and was active in the debate club, chess club, and soccer. He and his brother Yonatan grew dissatisfied with a perceived superficial way of life they encountered in the area, including the prevalent youth counterculture movement, and the liberal sensibilities of the Reform synagogue, Temple Judea of Philadelphia, that the family attended.

After graduating from high school in 1967, Netanyahu returned to Israel to enlist in the Israel Defense Forces. He trained as a combat soldier and served for five years in a special forces unit of the IDF, Sayeret Matkal. He took part in numerous cross-border assault raids during the 1967–70 War of Attrition, rising to become a team-leader in the unit. He was wounded in combat on multiple occasions. He was involved in many other missions, including the 1968 Israeli raid on Lebanon and the rescue of the hijacked Sabena Flight 571 in May 1972, in which he was shot in the shoulder. He was discharged from active service in 1972 but remained in the Sayeret Matkal reserves. Following his discharge, he left to study in the United States but returned in October 1973 to serve in the Yom Kippur War. He took part in special forces raids along the Suez Canal against Egyptian forces before leading a commando attack deep inside Syrian territory, the details of which remain classified today.

Education

Netanyahu returned to the United States in late 1972 to study architecture at the Massachusetts Institute of Technology (MIT). After briefly returning to Israel to fight in the Yom Kippur War, he returned to the United States and under the name Ben Nitay, completed a bachelor's degree in architecture in February 1975 and earned a master's degree from the MIT Sloan School of Management in June 1976. Concurrently, he was studying towards a doctorate in political science, until his studies were broken off by the death of his brother in Operation Entebbe.

At MIT, Netanyahu studied a double-load, completing a master's degree (that would normally take four years) in only two and a half years, despite taking a break to fight in the Yom Kippur War. Professor Leon B. Groisser at MIT recalled: "He did superbly. He was very bright. Organized. Strong. Powerful. He knew what he wanted to do and how to get it done."

At that time he changed his name to Benjamin "Ben" Nitai (Nitai, a reference to both Mount Nitai and to the eponymous Jewish sage Nittai of Arbela, was a pen name often used by his father for articles). Years later, in an interview with the media, Netanyahu clarified that he decided to do so to make it easier for Americans to pronounce his name. This fact has been used by his political rivals to accuse him indirectly of a lack of Israeli national identity and loyalty.

In 1976, Netanyahu's older brother Yonatan Netanyahu was killed. Yonatan was serving as the commander of Benjamin's former unit, the Sayeret Matkal, and died during the counter-terrorism hostage-rescue mission Operation Entebbe in which his unit rescued more than 100 mostly Israeli hostages hijacked by terrorists and flown to the Entebbe Airport in Uganda.

In 1976, Netanyahu graduated near the top of his class at the MIT Sloan School of Management.

Early career
Netanyahu was headhunted to be an economic consultant for the Boston Consulting Group in Boston, Massachusetts, working at the company between 1976 and 1978. At the Boston Consulting Group, he was a colleague of Mitt Romney, with whom he formed a lasting friendship. Romney described Netanyahu at the time as "a strong personality with a distinct point of view", and said, "We can almost speak in shorthand... [w]e share common experiences and have a perspective and underpinning which is similar." Netanyahu said that their "easy communication" was a result of "B.C.G.'s intellectually rigorous boot camp".

In 1978, Netanyahu appeared on Boston local television, under the name "Ben Nitai", where he argued: "The real core of the conflict is the unfortunate Arab refusal to accept the State of Israel... For 20 years the Arabs had both the West Bank and the Gaza Strip, and if self-determination, as they now say, is the core of the conflict, they could have easily established a Palestinian state."

In 1978, Netanyahu returned to Israel. Between 1978 and 1980, he ran the Jonathan Netanyahu Anti-Terror Institute, a non-governmental organization devoted to the study of terrorism; the Institute held a number of international conferences focused on the discussion of international terrorism. From 1980 to 1982, he was director of marketing for Rim Industries in Jerusalem. During this period Netanyahu made his first connections with several Israeli politicians, including Minister Moshe Arens.

Arens appointed him as his Deputy Chief of Mission at the Israeli Embassy in Washington, D.C. while Arens was ambassador to the United States, a position he held from 1982 until 1984. During the 1982 Lebanon War, he was called up for reserve duty in Sayeret Matkal and requested to be released from service, preferring to remain in the US and serve as a spokesperson for Israel in the wake of harsh international criticism of the war. He presented Israel's case to the media during the war and established a highly efficient public relations system in the Israeli embassy. Between 1984 and 1988, Netanyahu served as the Israeli ambassador to the United Nations. Netanyahu was influenced by Rabbi Menachem M. Schneerson, with whom he formed a relationship during the 1980s. He referred to Schneerson as "the most influential man of our time".

From 1984 to 1988, he served as the Israeli Ambassador to the United Nations. At this time Netanyahu became friends with Fred Trump, the father of future U.S. President Donald Trump.

Leader of the Opposition (1993–1996) 
Prior to the 1988 Israeli legislative election, Netanyahu returned to Israel and joined the Likud party. In the Likud's internal elections, Netanyahu was placed fifth on the party list. Later on he was elected as a Knesset member of the 12th Knesset, and was appointed as a deputy of the foreign minister Moshe Arens, and later on David Levy. Netanyahu and Levy did not cooperate and the rivalry between the two only intensified afterwards. During the Gulf War in early 1991, the English-fluent Netanyahu emerged as the principal spokesman for Israel in media interviews on CNN and other news outlets. During the Madrid Conference of 1991 Netanyahu was a member of the Israeli delegation headed by Prime Minister Yitzhak Shamir. After the Madrid Conference Netanyahu was appointed as Deputy Minister in the Israeli Prime Minister's Office.

Following the defeat of the Likud party in the 1992 Israeli legislative elections the Likud party held a party leadership election in 1993, and Netanyahu was victorious, defeating Benny Begin, son of the late prime minister Menachem Begin, and veteran politician David Levy (Sharon initially sought Likud party leadership as well, but quickly withdrew when it was evident that he was attracting minimal support). Shamir retired from politics shortly after the Likud's defeat in the 1992 elections.

Following the assassination of Yitzhak Rabin, his temporary successor Shimon Peres decided to call early elections in order to give the government a mandate to advance the peace process. Netanyahu was the Likud's candidate for prime minister in the 1996 Israeli legislative election which took place on 29 May 1996 and were the first Israeli elections in which Israelis elected their prime minister directly. Netanyahu hired American Republican political operative Arthur Finkelstein to run his campaign, and although the American style of sound bites and sharp attacks elicited harsh criticism, Netanyahu won the 1996 election, becoming the youngest person in the history of the position and the first Israeli prime minister to be born in the State of Israel (Yitzhak Rabin was born in Jerusalem, under the British Mandate of Palestine, prior to the 1948 founding of the Israeli state).

Netanyahu's victory over the pre-election favorite Shimon Peres surprised many. The main catalyst in the downfall of the latter was a wave of suicide bombings shortly before the elections; on 3 and 4 March 1996, Palestinians carried out two suicide bombings, killing 32 Israelis, with Peres seemingly unable to stop the attacks. During the campaign, Netanyahu stressed that progress in the peace process would be based on the Palestinian National Authority fulfilling its obligations–mainly fighting terrorism—and the Likud campaign slogan was, "Netanyahu – making a safe peace". However, although Netanyahu won the election for prime minister, Peres's Israeli Labor Party received more seats in the Knesset elections. Netanyahu had to rely on a coalition with the ultra-Orthodox parties, Shas and UTJ in order to form a government.

Prime minister (1996–1999)

First term 

A spate of suicide bombings reinforced the Likud position for security. Hamas claimed responsibility for most of the bombings. As prime minister, Netanyahu raised many questions about many central premises of the Oslo Accords. One of his main points was disagreement with the Oslo premise that the negotiations should proceed in stages, meaning that concessions should be made to Palestinians before any resolution was reached on major issues, such as the status of Jerusalem, and the amending of the Palestinian National Charter. Oslo supporters had claimed that the multi-stage approach would build goodwill among Palestinians and would propel them to seek reconciliation when these major issues were raised in later stages. Netanyahu said that these concessions only gave encouragement to extremist elements, without receiving any tangible gestures in return. He called for tangible gestures of Palestinian goodwill in return for Israeli concessions. Despite his stated differences with the Oslo Accords, Prime Minister Netanyahu continued their implementation, but his Premiership saw a marked slow-down in the peace process.

In 1996, Netanyahu and Jerusalem's mayor Ehud Olmert decided to open an exit in the Arab Quarter for the Western Wall Tunnel, which prior prime minister Shimon Peres had instructed to be put on hold for the sake of peace. This sparked three days of rioting by Palestinians, resulting in dozens of both Israelis and Palestinians being killed.

Netanyahu first met Palestinian President Arafat on 4 September 1996. Prior to the meeting, the two leaders spoke by telephone. The meetings would continue through Autumn 1996. On their first meeting, Netanyahu said: "I would like to emphasize that we have to take into account the needs and the requirements of both sides on the basis of reciprocity and the assurance of the security and well-being of both Israelis and Palestinian alike." Arafat said: "We are determined to work with Mr. Netanyahu and with his government." The talks culminated on 14 January 1997, in the signing of the Hebron Protocol. The signing of the Hebron Protocol with the Palestinian Authority resulted in the redeployment of Israeli forces in Hebron and the turnover of civilian authority in much of the area to the control of the Palestinian Authority.

Eventually, the lack of progress of the peace process led to new negotiations which produced the Wye River Memorandum in 1998 which detailed the steps to be taken by the Israeli government and Palestinian Authority to implement the earlier Interim Agreement of 1995. It was signed by Netanyahu and PLO chairman Yasser Arafat, and on 17 November 1998, Israel's 120 member parliament, the Knesset, approved the Wye River Memorandum by a vote of 75–19. In a nod to the 1967 Khartoum conference, Prime Minister Netanyahu emphasized a policy of "three no(s)": no withdrawal from the Golan Heights, no discussion of the case of Jerusalem, no negotiations under any preconditions.

In 1997, Netanyahu authorized a Mossad operation to assassinate Hamas leader Khaled Mashal in Jordan, just 3 years after the two countries had signed a peace treaty. The Mossad team, covering as five Canadian tourists, entered Jordan on 27 September 1997 and injected poison into Mashal's ears in a street in Amman. The plot was exposed and two agents were arrested by the Jordanian police while three others hid in the Israeli embassy which was then surrounded by troops. An angry King Hussein demanded Israel to give out the antidote and threatened to annul the peace treaty. Netanyahu relented to the demands after pressure by US President Bill Clinton and ordered the release of 61 Jordanian and Palestinian prisoners including Sheikh Ahmad Yassin. The incident sent the nascent Israeli-Jordanian relations plummeting.

During his term, Netanyahu also began a process of economic liberalization, taking steps towards a free-market economy. Under his watch, the government began selling its shares in banks and major state-run companies. Netanyahu also greatly eased Israel's strict foreign exchange controls, enabling Israelis to take an unrestricted amount of money out of the country, open foreign bank accounts, hold foreign currency, and invest freely in other countries.

Throughout his term, Netanyahu was opposed by the political left wing in Israel and lost support from the right because of his concessions to the Palestinians in Hebron and elsewhere, and due to his negotiations with Arafat generally. Netanyahu lost favor with the Israeli public after a long chain of scandals involving his marriage and corruption charges. In 1997, police recommended that Netanyahu be indicted on corruption charges for influence-peddling. He was accused of appointing an attorney general who would reduce the charges but prosecutors ruled that there was insufficient evidence to go to trial. In 1999, Netanyahu faced another scandal when the Israel Police recommended that he be tried for corruption for $100,000 in free services from a government contractor; Israel's attorney general did not prosecute, citing difficulties with evidence.

Election defeat
After being defeated by Ehud Barak in the 1999 Israeli prime ministerial election, Netanyahu temporarily retired from politics. He subsequently served as a senior consultant with Israeli communications equipment manufacturer BATM Advanced Communications for two years.

With the fall of the Barak government in late 2000, Netanyahu expressed his desire to return to politics. By law, Barak's resignation was supposed to lead to elections for the prime minister position only. Netanyahu insisted that general elections should be held, claiming that otherwise it would be impossible to have a stable government. Netanyahu decided eventually not to run for the prime minister position, a move which facilitated the surprising rise to power of Ariel Sharon, who at the time was considered less popular than Netanyahu. In 2002, after the Israeli Labor Party left the coalition and vacated the position of foreign minister, Prime Minister Ariel Sharon appointed Netanyahu as Foreign Minister. Netanyahu challenged Sharon for the leadership of the Likud party in the 2002 Likud leadership election, but failed to oust him.

On 9 September 2002, a scheduled speech by Netanyahu at Concordia University in Montreal, Quebec, Canada was canceled after hundreds of pro-Palestinian protesters overwhelmed security and smashed through a glass window. Netanyahu was not present at the protest, having remained at Montreal's Ritz-Carlton Hotel throughout the duration. He later accused the activists of supporting terrorism and "mad zealotry". Weeks later on 1 October 2002 around 200 protesters met Netanyahu outside his Heinz Hall appearance in Pittsburgh although Pittsburgh Police, Israeli security and a Pittsburgh SWAT unit allowed his speeches to continue downtown at the hall and the Duquesne Club as well as suburban Robert Morris University.

On 12 September 2002, Netanyahu testified (under oath as a private citizen) before the U.S. House of Representatives Committee on Oversight and Government Reform regarding the nuclear threat posed by the Iraqi régime: "There is no question whatsoever that Saddam is seeking and is working and is advancing towards the development of nuclear weapons – no question whatsoever", he said. "And there is no question that once he acquires it, history shifts immediately." In his testimony, Netanyahu also said, "If you take out Saddam, Saddam's regime, I guarantee you that it will have enormous positive reverberations on the region."

Minister of Finance (2003–2005) 
After the 2003 Israeli legislative election, in what many observers regarded as a surprise move, Sharon offered the Foreign Ministry to Silvan Shalom and offered Netanyahu the Finance Ministry. Some pundits speculated that Sharon made the move because he deemed Netanyahu a political threat given his demonstrated effectiveness as Foreign Minister, and that by placing him in the Finance Ministry during a time of economic uncertainty, he could diminish Netanyahu's popularity. Netanyahu accepted the new appointment. Sharon and Netanyahu came to an agreement that Netanyahu would have complete freedom as Finance Minister and have Sharon back all of his reforms, in exchange for Netanyahu's silence over Sharon's management of Israel's military and foreign affairs.

As Finance Minister, Netanyahu undertook an economic plan in order to restore Israel's economy from its low point during the Second Intifada. Netanyahu claimed that a bloated public sector and excessive regulations were largely responsible for stifling economic growth. His plan involved a move toward more liberalized markets, although it was not without its critics. He instituted a program to end welfare dependency by requiring people to apply for jobs or training, reduced the size of the public sector, froze government spending for three years, and capped the budget deficit at 1%. The taxation system was streamlined and taxes were cut, with the top individual tax rate reduced from 64% to 44% and the corporate tax rate from 36% to 18%. A host of state assets worth billions of dollars were privatized, including banks, oil refineries, the El Al national airline, and Zim Integrated Shipping Services. The retirement ages for both men and women were raised, and currency exchange laws were further liberalized. Commercial banks were forced to spin off their long-term savings. In addition, Netanyahu attacked monopolies and cartels to increase competition. As the Israeli economy started booming and unemployment fell significantly, Netanyahu was widely credited by commentators as having performed an 'economic miracle' by the end of his tenure.

However, opponents in the Labor party (and even a few within his own Likud) viewed Netanyahu's policies as "Thatcherite" attacks on the venerated Israeli social safety net. Ultimately, unemployment declined while economic growth soared, the debt-to-GDP ratio dropped to one of the lowest in the world, and foreign investment reached record highs.

Netanyahu threatened to resign from office in 2004 unless the Gaza pullout plan was put to a referendum. He later modified the ultimatum and voted for the program in the Knesset, indicating immediately thereafter that he would resign unless a referendum was held within 14 days. He submitted his resignation letter on 7 August 2005, shortly before the Israeli cabinet voted 17 to 5 to approve the initial phase of withdrawal from Gaza.

Leader of the Opposition (2006–2009) 
Following the withdrawal of Sharon from the Likud, Netanyahu was one of several candidates who vied for the Likud leadership. His most recent attempt prior to this was in September 2005 when he had tried to hold early primaries for the position of the head of the Likud party, while the party held the office of prime minister – thus effectively pushing Ariel Sharon out of office. The party rejected this initiative. Netanyahu retook the leadership on 20 December 2005, with 47% of the primary vote, to 32% for Silvan Shalom and 15% for Moshe Feiglin. In the March 2006 Knesset elections, Likud took the third place behind Kadima and Labor and Netanyahu served as Leader of the Opposition. On 14 August 2007, Netanyahu was reelected as chairman of the Likud and its candidate for the post of prime minister with 73% of the vote, against far-right candidate Moshe Feiglin and World Likud chairman Danny Danon. He opposed the 2008 Israel–Hamas ceasefire, like others in the Knesset opposition. Specifically, Netanyahu said: "This is not a relaxation, it's an Israeli agreement to the rearming of Hamas ... What are we getting for this?"

In the first half of 2008, doctors removed a small colon polyp that proved to be benign.

Following Tzipi Livni's election to head Kadima and Olmert's resignation from the post of prime minister, Netanyahu declined to join the coalition Livni was trying to form and supported new elections, which were held in February 2009. Netanyahu was the Likud's candidate for prime minister in the 2009 Israeli legislative election which took place on 10 February 2009, as Livni, the previous designated acting prime minister under the Olmert government, had been unable to form a viable governing coalition. Opinion polls showed Likud in the lead, but with as many as a third of Israeli voters undecided.

In the election itself, Likud won the second highest number of seats, Livni's party having outnumbered the Likud by one seat. A possible explanation for Likud's relatively poor showing is that some Likud supporters defected to Avigdor Lieberman's Yisrael Beiteinu party. Netanyahu, however, claimed victory on the basis that right-wing parties won the majority of the vote, and on 20 February 2009, Netanyahu was designated by Israeli President Shimon Peres to succeed Ehud Olmert as prime minister, and began his negotiations to form a coalition government.

Despite right wing parties winning a majority of 65 seats in the Knesset, Netanyahu preferred a broader centrist coalition and turned to his Kadima rivals, chaired by Tzipi Livni, to join his government. This time it was Livni's turn to decline to join, with a difference of opinion on how to pursue the peace process being the stumbling block. Netanyahu did manage to entice a smaller rival, the Labour party, chaired by Ehud Barak, to join his government, giving him a certain amount of centrist tone. Netanyahu presented his cabinet for a Knesset "Vote of Confidence" on 31 March 2009. The 32nd Government was approved that day by a majority of 69 lawmakers to 45 (with five abstaining) and the members were sworn in.

Prime minister (2009–2021)

Second term 

In 2009, US Secretary of State Hillary Clinton voiced support for the establishment of a Palestinian state – a solution not endorsed by prime minister-designate Benjamin Netanyahu, with whom she had earlier pledged the United States' cooperation. Upon the arrival of President Obama administration's special envoy, George Mitchell, Netanyahu said that any furtherance of negotiations with the Palestinians would be conditioned on the Palestinians recognizing Israel as a Jewish state.

During President Obama's Cairo speech on 4 June 2009 in which Obama addressed the Muslim world, Obama stated, among other things, "The United States does not accept the legitimacy of continued Israeli settlements." Following Obama's Cairo speech Netanyahu immediately called a special government meeting. On 14 June, ten days after Obama's Cairo speech, Netanyahu gave a speech at Bar-Ilan University in which he endorsed a "Demilitarized Palestinian State", though said that Jerusalem must remain the unified capital of Israel. Netanyahu stated that he would accept a Palestinian state if Jerusalem were to remain the united capital of Israel, the Palestinians would have no army, and the Palestinians would give up their demand for a right of return. He also argued the right for a "natural growth" in the existing Jewish settlements in the West Bank while their permanent status is up to further negotiation. Senior Palestinian official, Sereb Ereket, said that the speech had "closed the door to permanent status negotiations" due to Netanyahu's declarations on Jerusalem, refugees and settlements.

Three months after starting his term, Netanyahu remarked that his cabinet already had achieved several notable successes, such as the establishment of a working national unity government, and a broad consensus for a "two-state solution". A July 2009 survey by Ha'aretz found that most Israelis supported the Netanyahu government, giving him a personal approval rating of about 49 percent. Netanyahu has lifted checkpoints in the West Bank in order to allow freedom of movement and a flow of imports; a step that resulted in an economic boost in the West Bank. In 2009, Netanyahu welcomed the Arab Peace initiative (also known as the "Saudi Peace Initiative") and lauded a call by Bahrain's Crown Prince Salman bin Hamad bin Isa Al Khalifa to normalize relations with Israel.

In August 2009, Palestinian Authority chairman Mahmoud Abbas declared that he would be willing to meet with Prime Minister Netanyahu at the UN General Assembly, where Netanyahu had accepted president Obama's invitation for a "triple summit", although he said it would not necessarily lead to negotiations. Netanyahu was reported to be in a pivotal moment over these understandings, that were reported to include a compromise over permission on continuing the already approved construction in the West Bank in exchange for freezing all settlements thereafter, as well as continuing building in East Jerusalem, and at the same time stopping the demolition of houses of Arab inhabitants there. On 4 September 2009, it was reported that Netanyahu was to agree to settlers' political demands to approve more settlement constructions before a temporary settlement freeze agreement took place. White House spokesman Robert Gibbs expressed "regret" over the move; however, one U.S. official said the move will not "derail [the] train".

On 7 September 2009, Netanyahu left his office without reporting where he was headed. The prime minister's military secretary, Maj. Gen. Meir Kalifi, later reported Netanyahu had visited a security facility in Israel. Several different news agencies reported several different stories about where he was. On 9 September 2009, Yedioth Ahronoth reported that the Israeli leader had made a secret flight to Moscow to try to persuade Russian officials not to sell S-300 anti-aircraft missile systems to Iran. Headlines branded Netanyahu a "liar" and dubbed the affair a "fiasco". It was later reported that the PM's military secretary would be dismissed due to the affair. The Sunday Times reported that the trip was made to share the names of Russian scientists that Israel believes are abetting the alleged Iranian nuclear weapons program.

On 24 September 2009, in an address to the United Nations General Assembly in New York, Netanyahu said Iran poses a threat to the peace of the world and that it is incumbent on the world body to prevent the Islamic Republic from obtaining nuclear weapons. Waving the blueprints for Auschwitz and invoking the memory of his own family members murdered by the Nazis, Netanyahu delivered a passionate and public riposte to Iranian president Mahmoud Ahmadinejad's questioning of the Holocaust, asking: "Have you no shame?"

In response to pressure from the Obama administration urging the sides to resume peace talks, on 25 November 2009 Netanyahu announced a partial 10-month settlement construction freeze plan. The announced partial freeze had no significant effect on actual settlement construction, according to an analysis by the major Israeli daily Haaretz. U.S. special envoy George Mitchell said, "while the United States shares Arab concerns about the limitations of Israel's gesture, it is more than any Israeli government has ever done". In his announcement Netanyahu called the move "a painful step that will encourage the peace process" and urged the Palestinians to respond. The Palestinians rejected the call, stating the gesture was "insignificant" in that thousands of recently approved settlement buildings in the West Bank would continue to be built and there would be no freeze of settlement activity in East Jerusalem.

In March 2010, Israel's government approved construction of an additional 1,600 apartments in a large Jewish housing development in northern East Jerusalem called Ramat Shlomo despite the position of the current U.S. Government that acts such as this thwart the peace talks between Israel and the Palestinians. The Israeli government's announcement occurred during a visit by U.S. Vice-President Joe Biden and the U.S. government subsequently issued a strongly worded condemnation of the plan. Netanyahu subsequently issued a statement that all previous Israeli governments had continuously permitted construction in the neighborhood, and that certain neighborhoods such as Ramat Shlomo and Gilo have always been included as part of Israel in any final agreement plan that has been proposed by either side to date. Netanyahu regretted the timing of the announcement but asserted that "our policy on Jerusalem is the same policy followed by all Israeli governments for the 42 years, and it has not changed."

In September 2010, Netanyahu agreed to enter direct talks, mediated by the Obama administration, with the Palestinians for the first time in a long while. The ultimate aim of these direct talks is to forge the framework of an official "final status settlement" to the Israeli–Palestinian conflict by forming a two-state solution for the Jewish people and the Palestinian people. On 27 September, the 10-month settlement freeze ended, and the Israeli government approved new construction in the West Bank, including East Jerusalem. On retiring from office in July 2011, former U.S. Secretary of Defense Robert Gates had said that Netanyahu was ungrateful to the United States and endangering Israel. Responding, the Likud party defended Netanyahu by saying that most Israelis supported the Prime Minister and that he had broad support in the United States.

Netanyahu unsuccessfully called for the early release of Jonathan Pollard, an American serving a life sentence for passing secret U.S. documents to Israel in 1987. He has raised the issue at the Wye River Summit in 1998, where he claimed that U.S. President Bill Clinton had privately agreed to release Pollard. In 2002, Netanyahu visited Pollard at his North Carolina prison. The Israeli prime minister maintained contact with Pollard's wife, and was active in pressing the Obama administration to release Pollard.

In 2011, social justice protests broke out across Israel. Hundreds of thousands of people protested Israel's high cost of living throughout the country. In response, Netanyahu appointed the Trajtenberg Committee, headed by professor Manuel Trajtenberg, to examine the problems and propose solutions. The committee submitted recommendations to lower the high cost of living in September 2011. Although Netanyahu promised to push the proposed reforms through the cabinet in one piece, differences inside his coalition resulted in the reforms being gradually adopted.

Netanyahu's cabinet also approved a plan to build a fiber-optic cable network across the country to bring cheap, high-speed fiber-optic Internet access to every home.

In 2012, Netanyahu initially planned to call early elections, but subsequently oversaw the creation of a controversial government of national unity to see Israel through until the national elections of 2013. In May 2012, Netanyahu officially recognized for the first time the right for Palestinians to have their own state in an official document, a letter to Mahmoud Abbas, though as before he declared it would have to be demilitarized. On 25 October 2012, Netanyahu and Foreign Minister Avigdor Lieberman announced that their respective political parties, Likud and Yisrael Beiteinu, had merged and would run together on a single ballot in Israel's 22 January 2013 general elections.

Third term 

The 2013 election returned Netanyahu's Likud Beiteinu coalition with 11 fewer seats than the combined Likud and Yisrael Beiteinu parties had going into the vote. Nevertheless, as leader of what remained the largest faction in the Knesset, Israeli president Shimon Peres charged Netanyahu with the task of forming the Thirty-third government of Israel. The new coalition included the Yesh Atid, The Jewish Home and Hatnuah parties and excludes the ultra-Orthodox parties at the insistence of Yesh Atid and the Jewish Home.

During Netanyahu's third term, he continued his policy of economic liberalization. In December 2013, the Knesset approved the Business Concentration Law, which intended to open Israel's highly concentrated economy to competition to lower consumer prices, reduce income inequality, and increase economic growth. Netanyahu had formed the Concentration Committee in 2010, and the bill, which was pushed forward by his government, implemented its recommendations. The new law banned multi-tiered corporate holding structures, in which a CEO's family members or other affiliated individuals held public companies which in turn owned other public companies, and who were thus able to engage in price gouging. Under the law, corporations were banned from owning more than two tiers of publicly listed companies and from holding both financial and non-financial enterprises. All conglomerates were given four to six years to sell excess holdings. Netanyahu also began a campaign of port privatization to break what he viewed as the monopoly held by workers of the Israel Port Authority, so as to lower consumer prices and increase exports. In July 2013, he issued tenders for the construction of private ports in Haifa and Ashdod. Netanyahu has also pledged to curb excess bureaucracy and regulations to ease the burden on industry.

In April 2014, and again in June, Netanyahu spoke of his deep concerns when Hamas and the Palestinian Authority agreed and then formed a unity government, and was severely critical of both the United States and European governments' decision to work with the Palestinian coalition government. He blamed Hamas for the kidnapping and murder of three Israeli teenagers in June 2014, and launched a massive search and arrest operation on the West Bank, targeting members of Hamas in particular, and over the following weeks hit 60 targets in Gaza. Missile and rocket exchanges between Gaza militants and the IDF escalated after the bodies of the teenagers, who had been killed almost immediately as the government had good reasons to suspect, were discovered on 30 June 2014. After several Hamas operatives were killed, either in an explosion or from an Israeli bombing, Hamas officially declared it would launch rockets from Gaza into Israel, and Israel started Operation Protective Edge in the Gaza Strip, formally ending the November 2012 ceasefire agreement. The prime minister did a round of television shows in the United States and described Hamas as "genocidal terrorists" in an interview on CNN. When asked if Gazan casualties from the operation might spark "a third intifada", Netanyahu replied that Hamas was working towards that goal.

In October 2014, Netanyahu's government approved a privatization plan to reduce corruption and politicization in government companies, and strengthen Israel's capital market. Under the plan, minority stakes of up to 49% in state-owned companies, including arms manufacturers, energy, postal, water, and railway companies, as well as the ports of Haifa and Ashdod. That same month, Netanyahu called criticism of settlements "against the American values", a remark that earned him a sharp rebuke from the White House Press Secretary Josh Earnest, who noted that American values had resulted in Israel receiving not only consistent funding but protective technology such as Iron Dome. Netanyahu explained that he does not accept restrictions on where Jews could live, and said that Jerusalem's Arabs and Jews should be able to buy homes wherever they want. He said he was "baffled" by the American condemnation. "It's against the American values. And it doesn't bode well for peace. The idea that we'd have this ethnic purification as a condition for peace, I think it's anti-peace." Not long thereafter, Jeffrey Goldberg of The Atlantic reported that the relationship between Netanyahu and the White House had reached a new low, with the U.S. administration angry over Israel's settlement policies, and Netanyahu expressing contempt for the American administration's grasp of the Middle East.

On 2 December 2014, Netanyahu fired two of his ministers, Finance Minister Yair Lapid, who heads the centrist Yesh Atid party and Justice Minister Tzipi Livni, who heads Hatnua. The changes led to the dissolution of the government, with new elections expected on 17 March 2015.

In January 2015, Netanyahu was invited to address the US Congress. This speech marked Netanyahu's third speech to a joint session of Congress. The day before announcing he would address Congress, Time reported that he tried to derail a meeting between U.S. lawmakers and the head of Mossad, Tamir Pardo, who intended warning them against imposing further sanctions against Iran, a move that might derail nuclear talks. Leading up to the speech, on 3 March 2015, Israeli consuls general in the United States "expect[ed] fierce negative reaction from U.S. Jewish communities and Israel's allies". Objections included the arrangement of the speech without the support and engagement of the Obama administration and the timing of the speech before Israel's 17 March 2015 election. Seven American Jewish lawmakers met with Ron Dermer, Israel's ambassador to the U.S. and recommended that Netanyahu instead meet with lawmakers privately to discuss Iran. In making the speech, Netanyahu claimed to speak for all Jews worldwide, a claim disputed by others in the Jewish community. Rebecca Vilkomerson, executive director of Jewish Voice for Peace, stated that "American Jews are largely appalled by the notion that Netanyahu, or any other Israeli politician – one that we did not elect and do not choose to be represented by – claims to speak for us."

As election day approached in what was perceived to be a close race in the 2015 Israeli elections, Netanyahu answered 'indeed' when asked whether a Palestinian state would not be established in his term. He said that support of a Palestinian state is tantamount to yielding territory for radical Islamic terrorists to attack Israel. However, Netanyahu reiterated "I don't want a one-state solution. I want a peaceful, sustainable two-state solution. I have not changed my policy."

Fourth term 

In the 2015 election, Netanyahu returned with his party Likud leading the elections with 30 mandates, making it the single highest number of seats for the Knesset. President Rivlin granted Netanyahu an extension until 6 May 2015 to build a coalition when one had not been finalized in the first four weeks of negotiations. He formed a coalition government within two hours of the midnight 6 May deadline. His Likud party formed the coalition with Jewish Home, United Torah Judaism, Kulanu, and Shas.

On 28 May 2015, Netanyahu announced that he would be running for an unprecedented fifth term as prime minister in the next general election and that he supports Likud's current process of picking MK candidates.

In August 2015, Netanyahu's government approved a two-year budget that would see agricultural reforms and lowering of import duties to reduce food prices, deregulation of the approval process in construction to lower housing costs and speed up infrastructure building, and reforms in the financial sector to boost competition and lower fees for financial services. In the end, the government was forced to compromise by removing some key agricultural reforms.

In October 2015, Netanyahu drew widespread criticism for claiming that the Grand Mufti of Jerusalem, Haj Amin al-Husseini, gave Adolf Hitler the idea for the Holocaust in the preceding months to the Second World War, convincing the Nazi leader to exterminate Jews rather than just expel them from Europe. This idea is dismissed by mainstream historians, who note that al-Husseini's meeting with Hitler took place approximately five months after the mass murder of Jews began. German Chancellor Angela Merkel said she did not accept Netanyahu's claims, and reiterated an acceptance of her country's crimes during the Nazi era. Netanyahu later explained that his "aim was not to absolve Hitler from the responsibility he bears, but to show that the father of the Palestinian nation at the time, without a state and before the 'occupation', without the territories and with the settlements, even then aspired with systemic incitement for the destruction of the Jews." Some of the strongest criticism came from Israeli academics: Yehuda Bauer said Netanyahu's claim was "completely idiotic", while Moshe Zimmermann stated that "any attempt to deflect the burden from Hitler to others is a form of Holocaust denial."

In March 2016, Netanyahu's coalition faced a potential crisis as ultra-Orthodox members threatened to withdraw over the government's proposed steps to create non-Orthodox prayer space at the Western Wall. They have stated they will leave the coalition if the government offers any further official state recognition of Conservative and Reform Judaism.

On 23 December 2016, the United States, under the Obama Administration, abstained from United Nations Security Council Resolution 2334, effectively allowing it to pass. On 28 December, U.S. Secretary of State John Kerry strongly criticized Israel and its settlement policies in a speech. Netanyahu strongly criticized both the UN Resolution and Kerry's speech in response. On 6 January 2017, the Israeli government withdrew its annual dues from the organization, which totaled $6 million in United States dollars.

On 22 February 2017, Netanyahu became the first serving prime minister of Israel to visit Australia. He was accompanied by his wife, Sara. The three-day official visit included a delegation of business representatives, and Netanyahu and Prime Minister of Australia Malcolm Turnbull were scheduled to sign several bilateral agreements. Netanyahu recalled that it was the Australian Light Horse regiments that liberated Beersheba during World War I, and this began what has been a relationship of 100 years between the countries.

On 12 October 2017, shortly after the United States announced the same action, Netanyahu's government announced it was leaving UNESCO due to what it saw as anti-Israel actions by the agency, and it made that decision official in December 2017. The Israeli government officially notified UNESCO of the withdrawal in late December 2017.

On 30 April 2018, Netanyahu accused Iran of not holding up its end of the Iran nuclear deal after presenting a cache of over 100,000 documents detailing the extent of Iran's nuclear program. Iran denounced Netanyahu's presentation as "propaganda".

Netanyahu praised the 2018 North Korea–United States summit. He said in a statement, "I commend US President Donald Trump on the historic summit in Singapore. This is an important step in the effort to rid the Korean peninsula of nuclear weapons."

On 19 July 2018, the Knesset passed the Nation-State Bill, a Basic Law supported by Netanyahu's coalition government. Analysts saw the bill as a sign of Netanyahu's coalition advancing a right-wing agenda.

Prior to the April 2019 Israeli legislative election, Netanyahu helped broker a deal that united the Jewish Home party with the far-right Otzma Yehudit party, in order to form the Union of the Right-Wing Parties. The motivation of the deal was to overcome the electoral threshold for smaller parties. The deal was criticized in the media, as Otzma is widely characterized as racist and traces its origins to the extremist Kahanist movement.

Criminal investigations and indictment

Since January 2017, Netanyahu has been investigated and questioned by Israeli police in two cases, "Case 1000" and "Case 2000". The two cases are connected. In Case 1000, Netanyahu is suspected of having obtained inappropriate favors from businessmen, including James Packer and Hollywood producer Arnon Milchan. Case 2000 involves alleged attempts to strike a deal with the publisher of the Yedioth Ahronot newspaper group, Arnon Mozes, to promote legislation to weaken Yedioth's main competitor, Israel Hayom, in exchange for more favorable coverage of Netanyahu.

On 3 August 2017, Israeli police confirmed for the first time that Netanyahu was suspected of crimes involving fraud, breach of trust, and bribes in cases "1000" and "2000". The next day, it was reported that the Prime Minister's former chief of staff, Ari Harow, had signed a deal with prosecutors to testify against Netanyahu in these cases.

On 13 February 2018, Israeli police recommended that Netanyahu be charged with corruption. According to a police statement, sufficient evidence exists to indict the prime minister on charges of bribery, fraud, and breach of trust in the two cases. Netanyahu responded that the allegations were baseless and that he would continue as prime minister. On 25 November 2018, it was reported that Economic Crimes Division Director Liat Ben-Ari recommended indictment for both cases.

On 28 February 2019, the Israeli attorney general announced his intent to file indictments against Netanyahu on bribe and fraud charges in three different cases. Netanyahu was formally indicted on 21 November 2019. If Netanyahu is convicted, he could face up to 10 years in prison for bribery and a maximum of three years for fraud and breach of trust. He is the first sitting prime minister in Israel's history to be charged with a crime. On 23 November 2019, it was announced that Netanyahu, in compliance with legal precedent set by the Israeli Supreme Court in 1993, would relinquish his agriculture, health, social affairs and diaspora affairs portfolios. The matter of forcing a prime minister to resign due to an indictment has yet to be tested in court. He was officially charged on 28 January 2020.

Netanyahu's criminal trial was set to begin on 24 May 2020, having been initially scheduled for March of that year but delayed due to the COVID-19 pandemic.

Fifth term 

On 17 May 2020, Netanyahu was sworn-in for a fifth term as prime minister in a coalition with Benny Gantz. Against a background of the COVID-19 pandemic in Israel and Netanyahu's criminal trial, extensive demonstrations broke out against him in front of the prime minister's residence. Following this, Netanyahu ordered to disperse the demonstrations using COVID-19 special regulations, limiting them to 20 people and at a distance of 1,000 meters from their homes. However, the exact opposite was achieved; the demonstrations were enlarged and dispersed to over 1,000 centers. By March 2021, Israel became the country with the highest vaccinated population per capita in the world against COVID-19.

After tensions escalated in Jerusalem in May 2021, Hamas fired rockets on Israel from Gaza, which prompted Netanyahu to initiate Operation Guardian of the Walls, lasting eleven days. After the operation, Israeli politician and leader of the Yamina alliance Naftali Bennett announced that he had agreed to a deal with Leader of the Opposition Yair Lapid to form a rotation government that would oust Netanyahu from his position as prime minister. On 13 June 2021, Bennett and Lapid formed a coalition government, and Netanyahu was ousted as prime minister, ending his 12-year tenure.

Leader of the Opposition (2021–2022)
After the end of his second premiership, Netanyahu began his third stint as the leader of the opposition. Likud remained the largest party in the twenty-fourth Knesset.
He led the opposition into the 2022 Israeli legislative election.

Prime minister (2022–present)

Sixth term 

After the 2022 election, Netanyahu was sworn in as Prime Minister again as the leader of a hardline coalition. He officially started his sixth term on 29 December 2022.

Political positions

Economic views 

Netanyahu has been described as "the advocate of the free-market". As prime minister in his first term, he significantly reformed the banking sector, removing barriers to investment abroad, mandatory purchases of government securities and direct credit. As Minister of Finance (2003–2005), Netanyahu introduced a major overhaul of the Israeli economy. He introduced a welfare to work program, he led a program of privatization, reduced the size of the public sector, reformed and streamlined the taxation system and passed laws against monopolies and cartels with the aim of increasing competition. Netanyahu extended capital gains taxes from companies to individuals, which allowed him to enlarge the tax base while reducing taxes on incomes. As the Israeli economy started booming and unemployment fell significantly, Netanyahu was widely credited by commentators as having performed an 'economic miracle' by the end of his tenure. Direct investment in the Israeli economy had increased by an annualized 380%. On the other hand, his critics have labelled his economic views as Margaret Thatcher-inspired "popular capitalism".

Netanyahu defines capitalism as "the ability to have individual initiative and competition to produce goods and services with profit, but not to shut out somebody else from trying to do the same". He says that his views developed while he was working as an economic consult for Boston Consulting Group: "It was the first time that the Boston Consulting Group looked at governments and worked for governments. They wanted to do a strategic plan for the government of Sweden. I was on that case and looked at other governments. So I went around to other governments in Europe in 1976 and I was looking at Britain. I was looking at France. I was looking at other countries, and I could see that they were stymied by concentrations of power that prevented competition. And I thought, hmm, as bad as they are, ours was worse because we had very little room for private sector competition to the extent that we had government-controlled or union-controlled companies, and so you really didn't get the competition or the growth ... And I said, well, if I ever have a chance, I'll change that."

Views on counter-terrorism 

Netanyahu has said his own "hard line against all terrorists" came as a result of his brother's death. Yoni Netanyahu had been killed while leading the hostage-rescue mission at Operation Entebbe.

In addition to having taken part in counter-terrorist operations during his service in the military, Netanyahu has published three books on the subject of fighting terrorism. He identifies terrorism as a form of totalitarianism, writing: "The more far removed the target of the attack from any connection to the grievance enunciated by the terrorists, the greater the terror ... Yet for terrorism to have any impact, it is precisely the lack of connection, the lack of any possible involvement or "complicity" of the chosen victims in the cause the terrorists seek to attack, that produces the desired fear. For terrorism's underlying message is that every member of society is "guilty", that anyone can be a victim, and that therefore no one is safe ... In fact, the methods reveal the totalitarian strain that runs through all terrorist groups ... It is not only that the ends of the terrorists do not succeed in justifying the means they choose; their choice of means indicate what their true ends are. Far from being fighters for freedom, terrorists are the forerunners of tyranny. Terrorists use the techniques of violent coercion in order to achieve a regime of violent coercion."

Netanyahu cautions that "[t]he trouble with active anti-terror activities ... is that they do constitute a substantial intrusion on the lives of those being monitored." He believes there is a balance between civil liberties and security, which should depend on the level of sustained terrorist attacks in a country. During periods of sustained attack, there should be shift towards security, due to "the monstrous violation of personal rights which is the lot of the victims of terror and their families". But this should be regularly reviewed, with an emphasis on guarding civil liberties and individual privacy wherever and whenever security considerations allow: "The concern of civil libertarians over possible infringements of the rights of innocent citizens is well placed, and all additional powers granted the security services should require annual renewal by the legislature, this in addition to judicial oversight of actions as they are taken in the field."

He advises tighter immigration laws as an essential tool to preemptively combat terrorism: "This era of immigration free-for-all should be brought to an end. An important aspect of taking control of the immigration situation is stricter background checks of potential immigrants, coupled with the real possibility of deportation."

He also cautions that it is essential that governments do not conflate terrorists with those legitimate political groups that may or may not hold extremist views, but which advance their positions by means of debate and argument: "Democracies have their share of anti-immigrant or anti-establishment parties, as well as advocates of extreme nationalism or internationalism ... [T]hey are often genuinely convinced participants in democracy, accepting its basic ground rules and defending its central tenets. These can and must be distinguished from the tiny splinters at the absolute fringes of democratic society, which may endorse many similar ideas, but use them as a pretext to step outside the rubric of the democratic system".

In particular, Ronald Reagan was an admirer of Netanyahu's work on counter-terrorism, and Reagan recommended Netanyahu's book Terrorism: How the West Can Win to all senior figures in his administration.

Death penalty 
In 2017, Netanyahu called for the death penalty to be imposed on the perpetrator of the 2017 Halamish stabbing attack. Representatives in his government introduced a bill which would allow the death penalty for terrorism to the Knesset. In a preliminary vote in January 2018, 52 of 120 members of the Israeli parliament voted in favor while 49 opposed, to make it easier for judges to hand down the death penalty. The amendment to the penal code would still require three more readings if it is to become law.

LGBT rights 
Netanyahu supports equal rights for LGBT (lesbian, gay, bisexual, and transgender) persons. He said: "The struggle for every person to be recognized as equal before the law is a long struggle, and there is still a long way to go ... I am proud that Israel is among the most open countries in the world in relation to the LGBT community discourse." During an event held for the annual community rights day at the Knesset, Netanyahu said that he was "asked to come here in the middle of my busy schedule to say one thing to the male and female members of the LGBT community: We must be guided by the conviction that every person is created in the image of God." However, many of his coalition government's party members opposed same-sex marriage.

Ethiopian Jewish integration 

In 2015, after Ethiopian Jewish protests against police brutality, Netanyahu said: "We will bring a comprehensive plan to the government to assist you in every way. There is no room for racism and discrimination in our society, none ... We will turn racism into something contemptible and despicable."

African Hebrew Israelites of Jerusalem 
Netanyahu supports the integration of the African Hebrew Israelites of Jerusalem into Israeli society, and takes part in celebrations in honor of this community's "exodus" from America to Israel, which occurred in 1967. In 2012, Netanyahu expressed appreciation towards "the cooperative society that is working towards the inclusion of the Hebrew Israelite community in Israeli society at large," and declared that the experience of the community in the land of Israel is "an integral part of the Israeli experience."

Peace process 
Netanyahu opposed the Oslo accords from their inception. In 1993, he dedicated a chapter, entitled "Trojan Horse", of his book A Place Among the Nations to argue against the Oslo Peace Process. He asserted that Amin al-Husseini had been one of the masterminds of the Holocaust, and that Yasser Arafat was heir to the former's "alleged exterminationist Nazism". During his term as prime minister in the late 1990s, Netanyahu consistently reneged on commitments made by previous Israeli governments as part of the Oslo peace process, leading American peace envoy Dennis Ross to note that "neither President Clinton nor Secretary [of State Madeleine] Albright believed that Bibi had any real interest in pursuing peace." In a 2001 video, Netanyahu, reportedly unaware he was being recorded, said: "They asked me before the election if I'd honor [the Oslo Accords]", "I said I would, but ... I'm going to interpret the accords in such a way that would allow me to put an end to this galloping forward to the '67 borders. How did we do it? Nobody said what defined military zones were. Defined military zones are security zones; as far as I'm concerned, the entire Jordan Valley is a defined military zone. Go argue."

On 9 August 2009, speaking at the opening of his weekly cabinet meeting, Netanyahu promised not to repeat the "mistake" of the Gaza unilateral pullout, saying, "We will not repeat this mistake. We will not create new evacuees", and adding that "the unilateral evacuation brought neither peace nor security. On the contrary", and that "We want an agreement with two factors, the first of which is the recognition of Israel as the national state of the Jewish people and [the second is] a security settlement. In the case of Gaza, both of these factors were lacking". He also said, "Should we achieve a turn toward peace with the more moderate partners, we will insist on the recognition of the State of Israel and the demilitarization of the future Palestinian state". In October 2014, Netanyahu said "We don't just hand over territory, close our eyes and hope for the best. We did that in Lebanon and we got thousands of rockets. We did that in Gaza, we got Hamas and 15,000 rockets. So we're not gonna just replicate that. We want to see genuine recognition of the Jewish state and rock solid security arrangements on the ground. That's the position I've held, and it's only become firmer."

Netanyahu had previously called U.S.-backed peace talks a waste of time, while at the same time refusing to commit to the same two-state solution as had other Israeli leaders, until a speech in June 2009. He repeatedly made public statements which advocated an "economic peace" approach, meaning an approach based on economic cooperation and joint effort rather than continuous contention over political and diplomatic issues. This is in line with many significant ideas from the Peace Valley plan. He raised these ideas during discussions with former U.S. Secretary of State Condoleezza Rice. Netanyahu continued to advocate these ideas as the Israeli elections approached. Netanyahu has said:

 Right now, the peace talks are based on only one thing, only on peace talks. It makes no sense at this point to talk about the most contractible issue. It's Jerusalem or bust, or right of return or bust. That has led to failure and is likely to lead to failure again ... We must weave an economic peace alongside a political process. That means that we have to strengthen the moderate parts of the Palestinian economy by handing rapid growth in those areas, rapid economic growth that gives a stake for peace for the ordinary Palestinians."

In January 2009, prior to the February 2009 Israeli elections Netanyahu informed Middle East envoy Tony Blair that he would continue the policy of the Israeli governments of Ariel Sharon and Ehud Olmert by expanding settlements in the West Bank, in contravention of the Road Map, but not building new ones.

In 2013, Netanyahu denied reports that his government would agree to peace talks on the basis of the green line. In 2014 he agreed to the American framework based on the green line and said that Jewish settlers must be allowed the option of staying in their settlements under Palestinian rule.

In 2014, Palestinian negotiator Saeb Erekat criticized Netanyahu, calling him "ideologically corrupt" and a war criminal.

In January 2020, Netanyahu publicly supported Trump's Israeli-Palestinian peace plan.

Former United States Secretary of State Rex Tillerson stated that on 22 May 2017, Netanyahu showed Donald Trump a fake and altered video of Palestinian President Mahmoud Abbas calling for the killing of children. This was at a time when Trump was considering if Israel was the obstacle to peace. Netanyahu had showed Trump the fake video to change his position in the Israeli-Palestinian conflict.

The U.S.-brokered Abraham Accords agreed to the full normalization of relations between Israel and the United Arab Emirates (the Israel–United Arab Emirates normalization agreement) and Bahrain, respectively (the Bahrain–Israel normalization agreement). This was the first time any Arab country had normalized relations with Israel since Jordan in 1994. The accords were signed by Bahrain's foreign minister, UAE's foreign minister and Netanyahu on 15 September 2020 at the South Lawn of the White House in Washington, D.C.

On 23 October 2020, U.S. President Donald Trump announced that Sudan will start to normalize ties with Israel, making it the third Arab state to do so as part of the Trump administration-brokered Abraham Accords. Sudan fought in wars against Israel in 1948 and 1967. Netanyahu thanked "President Trump and his team above all", saying that "together with him we are changing history ... despite all the experts and commentators who said it was impossible. Israel was completely isolated and they told us we were heading into a political tsunami. What's happening is the absolute opposite." This was followed by Morocco establishing relations with Israel in December.

Bar-Ilan speech 

On 14 June 2009, Netanyahu delivered a seminal address at Bar-Ilan University (also known as the "Bar-Ilan speech"), at Begin-Sadat Center for Strategic Studies, that was broadcast live in Israel and across parts of the Arab world, on the topic of the Israeli–Palestinian peace process. He endorsed for the first time the notion of a Palestinian state alongside Israel. Netanyahu's speech could be viewed in part as a response to Obama's 4 June speech at Cairo. Yedioth Ahronoth claimed that Obama's words had "resonated through Jerusalem's corridors".

As part of his proposal, Netanyahu demanded the full demilitarization of the proposed state, with no army, rockets, missiles, or control of its airspace, and said that Jerusalem would be undivided Israeli territory. He stated that the Palestinians should recognize Israel as the Jewish national state with an undivided Jerusalem. He rejected a right of return for Palestinian refugees, saying, "any demand for resettling Palestinian refugees within Israel undermines Israel's continued existence as the state of the Jewish people." He also stated that a complete stop to settlement building in the West Bank, as required by the 2003 Road Map peace proposal, was not possible and the expansions will be limited based on the "natural growth" of the population, including immigration, with no new territories taken in. Nevertheless, Netanyahu affirmed that he accepted the Road Map proposal. He did not discuss whether or not the settlements should be part of Israel after peace negotiations, simply stating that the "question will be discussed".

In a response to U.S. President Barack Obama's statements in his Cairo speech, Netanyahu remarked, "there are those who say that if the Holocaust had not occurred, the State of Israel would never have been established. But I say that if the State of Israel would have been established earlier, the Holocaust would not have occurred." He also said, "this is the homeland of the Jewish people, this is where our identity was forged." He stated that he would be willing to meet with any "Arab leader" for negotiations without preconditions, specifically mentioning Syria, Saudi Arabia, and Lebanon. In general, the address represented a new position for Netanyahu's government on the peace process.

Some right-wing members of Netanyahu's governing coalition criticized his remarks for the creation of a Palestinian State, believing that all of the land should come under Israeli sovereignty. Likud MK Danny Danon said that Netanyahu went "against the Likud platform", while MK Uri Orbach of Habayit Hayehudi said that it had "dangerous implications". Opposition party Kadima leader Tzipi Livni remarked after the address that she thinks Netanyahu does not really believe in the two-state solution at all; she thought that he only said what he did as a feigned response to international pressure. Peace Now criticized the speech, highlighting that, in the group's opinion, it did not address the Palestinians as equal partners in the peace process. The Secretary General of Peace Now, Yariv Oppenheimer, said, "It's a rerun of Netanyahu from his first term".

On 9 August 2009, speaking at the opening of a government meeting, Netanyahu repeated his claims from the Palestinians: "We want an agreement with two factors, the first of which is the recognition of Israel as the national state of the Jewish people and (the second of which is) a security settlement".

Netanyahu's "Bar-Ilan speech" provoked mixed reaction from the international community. The Palestinian National Authority rejected the conditions on a Palestinian State given by Netanyahu. Senior official Saeb Erekat said, "Netanyahu's speech closed the door to permanent status negotiations". Hamas spokesman Fawzi Barhoum said it reflected a "racist and extremist ideology" and called on Arab nations to "form stronger opposition". Palestinian Islamic Jihad labeled it "misleading" and, like Hamas, demanded stronger opposition to Israel from Arab nations. According to The Jerusalem Post, some leaders advocated a third intifada in response to the speech. The Arab League dismissed the address, declaring in a statement that "Arabs would not make concessions regarding issues of Jerusalem and refugees" and that "we know his history and style of evasion", adding that the Arab League would not recognize Israel as a Jewish state. Referring to Netanyahu's demand that Palestinians recognize Israel as the state of the Jewish people, Egypt's president Hosni Mubarak remarked, "You won't find anyone to answer that call in Egypt, or in any other place." Issuing a less blunt response, the Egyptian Foreign Ministry said that the speech was "not complete" and that it hoped for another, "different Israeli proposal which is built on the commitment to the two-state solution". Syrian state media condemned the speech and wrote that "Netanyahu has confirmed that he rejects the Arab peace initiative for peace along with all the initiatives and resolutions of the Security Council to relative peace." Lebanese President Michel Suleiman called for unity among Arab leaders, saying that "Arab leaders should be more united and preserve the spirit of resistance to face the Israeli stands regarding the peace process and the Palestinian refugee issue." He called on the international community to exert more pressure on the Israeli government to accept the Arab Peace Initiative, as he said "Israel still has a will of military confrontation which can be proved in its offensives on Lebanon and the Gaza Strip." Jordanian Minister of State for Media affairs and Communications, and Government spokesperson Nabil Sharif issued a statement saying "The ideas presented by Netanyahu do not live up to what was agreed on by the international community as a starting point for achieving a just and comprehensive peace in the region." Former Iranian president Mahmoud Ahmadinejad referred to the speech as "bad news".

The Czech Republic praised Netanyahu's address. "In my view, this is a step in the right direction. The acceptance of a Palestinian state was present there", said Czech Foreign Minister Jan Kohout, whose country held the EU's six-month presidency at the time of the speech. President Barack Obama's press secretary, Robert Gibbs, said that the speech was an "important step forward". President Obama stated that "this solution can and must ensure both Israel's security and the Palestinians' legitimate aspirations for a viable state". Swedish Foreign Minister Carl Bildt stated that "the fact that he uttered the word state is a small step forward". He added that "whether what he mentioned can be defined as a state is a subject of some debate". France praised the speech but called on Israel to cease building settlements in the West Bank. French Foreign Minister Bernard Kouchner stated, "I can only welcome the prospect of a Palestinian state outlined by the Israeli prime minister." The Foreign Ministry of Russia called the speech "a sign of readiness for dialogue" but said that "it does not open up the road to resolving the Israeli–Palestinian problem. The conditions on the Palestinians would be unacceptable."

Iran 

In an 8 March 2007 interview with CNN, opposition leader Netanyahu claimed that "there is only one difference between Nazi Germany and the Islamic Republic of Iran, namely that the first entered a worldwide conflict and then sought atomic weapons, while the latter is first seeking atomic weapons and, once it has them, will then start a world war." Netanyahu repeated these remarks at a news conference in April 2008. This was similar to earlier remarks that "it's 1938, and Iran is Germany, and Iran is racing to arm itself with atomic bombs".

On 20 February 2009, after being asked to be the prime minister of Israel, Netanyahu described Iran as the greatest threat that Israel has ever faced: "Iran is seeking to obtain a nuclear weapon and constitutes the gravest threat to our existence since the war of independence." Speaking before the UN General Assembly in New York on 24 September 2009, Netanyahu expressed a different opinion than Iranian President Mahmoud Ahmadinejad's speech at the forum, saying those who believe Tehran is a threat only to Israel are wrong. "The Iranian regime", he said, "is motivated by fanaticism ... They want to see us go back to medieval times. The struggle against Iran pits civilization against barbarism. This Iranian regime is fueled by extreme fundamentalism." "By focusing solely on Iran", columnist Yossi Melman speculated that Netanyahu's foreign policy, "... took the Palestinian issue off the world agenda." After four days of shelling from the Iranian-funded Palestinian Islamic Jihad, Melman asked, "Is it worth initiating a crisis with Iran? Will the Israeli public be able to cope with Iran's response?" According to Uzi Eilam, a retired brigadier general and the ex-director of Israel's Atomic Energy Commission, Benjamin Netanyahu is using the threat of atomic Iran as a means of reaching his own goals. Directly blaming Netanyahu, he said: "Netanyahu is using the Iranian threat to achieve a variety of political objectives." He also said: "These declarations are unnecessarily scaring Israel's citizens, given Israel is not party to the negotiations to determine whether Iran will or will not dismantle its nuclear program."

By 2012, Netanyahu is reported to have formed a close, confidential relationship with Defense Minister Ehud Barak as the two men considered possible Israeli military action against Iran's nuclear facilities, following Israel's established Begin Doctrine. The pair were accused of acting on "messianic" impulses by Yuval Diskin, former head of the Shin Bet, who added that their warmongering rhetoric appealed to "the idiots within the Israeli public". Diskin's remarks were supported by former Mossad chief Meir Dagan, who himself had previously said that an attack on Iran was "the stupidest thing I have ever heard". A few weeks later, the RAND Corporation (a leading American think-tank that advises the Pentagon) also openly disagreed with Netanyahu's belligerent stance: "In doing so, and without naming names, RAND sided with former Mossad chief Meir Dagan and former head of the Shin Bet Yuval Diskin."

Early in 2012, he used the opening ceremony for Israel's Holocaust Remembrance Day to warn against the dangers of an Iranian nuclear bomb, saying he was following the example of Jewish leaders during World War II who struggled to raise the alarm about the Nazis' genocidal intentions. Israeli academic Avner Cohen accused Netanyahu of showing "contempt" for the Holocaust by putting it to "political use", and former Israeli foreign minister Shlomo Ben-Ami similarly condemned Netanyahu's "vulgar manipulation of the memory of the Holocaust". Immediately after the 2012 Burgas bus bombing, Netanyahu confirmed that the attack had been undertaken in coordination with Iran.

Netanyahu stated during a 29 July meeting that, in his opinion, "all the sanctions and diplomacy so far have not set back the Iranian programme by one iota". And in August he stated that the United States only might respond to a massive attack against Israel. On 28 September 2012, Netanyahu gave a speech to the UN General Assembly in which he set forward a "red line" of 90% uranium enrichment, stating that if Iran were to reach this level, it would become an intolerable risk for Israel. Netanyahu used a cartoon graphic of a bomb to illustrate his point, indicating three stages of uranium enrichment, noting that Iran had already completed the first stage, and stating that "By next spring, at most by next summer at current enrichment rates, [Iran] will have finished the medium enrichment and move on to the final stage. From there, it's only a few months, possibly a few weeks before they get enough enriched uranium for the first bomb." At the time, according to cables leaked in 2015, Mossad's assessment was that Iran did not appear ready to enrich uranium to levels required for a nuclear bomb.

In an October 2013 interview with BBC Persian Service, Netanyahu praised the history of Persia and said: "If the Iranian regime has nuclear weapons, the Iranian people will never be free of dictatorship and will live in eternal servitude."

The U.S. military's 2020 Baghdad International Airport airstrike, which killed the high-level Iranian General Qasem Soleimani, brought strong reactions from around the world. Netanyahu praised the air strike, saying that Trump had acted "swiftly, forcefully and decisively".

Bank of China terror financing case 
In 2013, Netanyahu found himself caught between conflicting commitments made to the family of American terror victim Daniel Wultz and the Government of China. Although Netanyahu was reported to have previously promised U.S. Representative Ileana Ros-Lehtinen that Israel would fully cooperate in the terror-financing case against Bank of China in U.S. District Court, the prime minister reportedly made a conflicting promise to the Government of China prior to a state visit to China in May 2013. Attorney David Boies, lead counsel for the Wultz family, told The Wall Street Journal, "While we are respectful of China's interests, and of the diplomatic pressure to which Israel has been subjected, those interests and that pressure cannot be permitted to obstruct the ability of American courts to hear critical evidence."

In August 2013, Ros-Lehtinen, chair of the House Middle East and South Asia subcommittee, told the Miami Herald she raised the issue while leading a congressional delegation to Israel, stressing to Israeli officials the importance of them providing the Wultz family what they need for their lawsuit. "I am hopeful that we can bring this case to a conclusion that is satisfactory to the family, but we need community support to not waver at this critical time," Ros-Lehtinen said.

U.S. Representative Debbie Wasserman Schultz, chair of the Democratic National Committee, also spoke out on the issue with the Miami Herald: "In South Florida, we all know too well of the tragic circumstances surrounding the cowardly terrorist attack that took Daniel Wultz's innocent life. I have been working, hand in hand with the Wultz family and the state of Israel to ensure any and all of those involved in this terrorist activity, including the Bank of China, pay for their crimes so that justice can be served."

Defense and security 

In 2011, Netanyahu arranged for 1000 Hamas and Fatah prisoners to be swapped for Gilad Shalit, including terrorists with "blood on their hands". Israeli officials estimate that 60% of those who are released "resume terrorism attacks".

In 2011, Israeli General Staff concluded that the armed forces cannot maintain their battle readiness under Netanyahu's proposed cuts. However Netanyahu decided to cut social programs instead, and promised to increase the defense budget by about six percent. In spite of this, the Israeli military still fell NIS 3.7 million short from its projected budget, which could damage their war capabilities. According to a U.S. State Department representative in November 2011, under the leadership of Netanyahu and Obama, Israel and the United States have enjoyed unprecedented security cooperation.

Under Netanyahu's leadership, the Israeli National Security Council has seen an expanded role in foreign policy planning and decision-making.

Illegal immigration
In his 1995 book Fighting Terrorism: How Democracies Can Defeat Domestic and International Terrorism, Netanyahu strongly argued that tightening immigration laws in the West is the most effective method to combat terrorism. "This era of immigration free-for-all should be brought to an end", he wrote in 1995.

In 2012 the Netanyahu government passed the "Prevention of Infiltration Law", which mandated automatic detention of all people, including asylum-seekers, who enter Israel without permission. Amnesty International called it "an affront to international law". Between 2009 and 2013, approximately 60,000 people crossed into Israel from various African countries. Netanyahu said that "this phenomenon is very grave and threatens the social fabric of society, our national security and our national identity." Many of these migrants are held in detention camps in the Negev desert. When the Supreme Court of Israel declared the "Prevention of Infiltration Law" illegal for permitting immediate and indefinite detention of asylum seekers from Africa, Netanyahu requested new legislation to work around the Supreme Court ruling.

Netanyahu is critical of what he sees as the overly open immigration policy of EU nations. Netanyahu has urged the leaders of Hungary, Slovakia, Czech Republic and Poland to close their borders to illegal immigration.

Personal life

Family tree

Family and background 
Netanyahu was born in Tel Aviv, to Prof. Benzion Netanyahu (original name Mileikowsky) and Tzila (Cela; née Segal). His mother was born in 1912 in Petah Tikva, then in Ottoman Palestine, now Israel. Though all his grandparents were born in the Russian Empire (now Belarus, Lithuania and Poland), his mother's parents emigrated to Minneapolis in the United States. He is related to Rabbi Eliyahu of Vilna (the Vilna Gaon) on his paternal side.

Netanyahu's father, Benzion, was a professor of Jewish history at Cornell University, editor of the Encyclopaedia Hebraica, and a senior aide to Ze'ev Jabotinsky, who remained active in research and writing into his nineties. Regarding the Palestinian people, he stated: "That they won't be able to face [anymore] the war with us, which will include withholding food from Arab cities, preventing education, terminating electrical power and more. They won't be able to exist, and they will run away from here. But it all depends on the war, and whether we will win the battles with them."

Netanyahu's paternal grandfather was Nathan Mileikowsky, a leading Zionist rabbi and JNF fundraiser. Netanyahu's older brother, Yonatan, was killed in Uganda during Operation Entebbe in 1976. His younger brother, Iddo, is a radiologist and writer. All three brothers served in the Sayeret Matkal reconnaissance unit of the Israel Defense Forces.

Marriages and relationships 

Netanyahu has been married three times. Netanyahu's first marriage was to Miriam Weizmann, whom he met in Israel. Weizmann lived near Yonatan Netanyahu's apartment in Jerusalem, where Netanyahu was based during his military service. By the time Netanyahu's service was finished, Weizmann had completed her own military service and a degree in chemistry from the Hebrew University of Jerusalem. In 1972, they both left to study in the United States, where she enrolled in Brandeis University, while Netanyahu studied at MIT. They married soon afterward. The couple had one daughter, Noa (born 29 April 1978).

In 1978, while Weizmann was pregnant, Netanyahu met a non-Jewish British student named Fleur Cates at the university library, and began an affair. His marriage ended in divorce soon afterward, when his wife Miriam discovered the affair. In 1981, Netanyahu married Cates, and she converted to Judaism. After moving with Netanyahu to Israel, Cates sued for divorce in 1988.

His third wife, Sara Ben-Artzi, was working as a flight attendant on an El Al flight from New York to Israel when they met. She was in the process of completing a master's degree in psychology. The couple married in 1991. They have two sons: Yair (born 26 July 1991), a former soldier in the IDF Spokesperson's Unit, and Avner (born 10 October 1994), a national Bible champion and winner of the National Bible Quiz for Youth in Kiryat Shmona and former soldier in the IDF Combat Intelligence Collection Corps.

In 1993, Netanyahu confessed on live television to having had an affair with Ruth Bar, his public relations adviser. He said that a political rival had planted a secret video camera that had recorded him in a sexually compromising position with Bar, and that he had been threatened with the release of the tape to the press unless he quit the Likud leadership race. Netanyahu and Sara repaired their marriage, and he was elected to the leadership of Likud. In 1996, the media reported that he had a 20-year friendship with Katherine Price-Mondadori, an Italian-American woman. During the 1990s, Netanyahu criticized this media intrusion into his private life, claiming that political rivals including David Levy had hired spies to try to gather evidence of alleged affairs. Generally, the Israeli public are not interested in their politicians' private lives and would prefer they remained private.

On 1 October 2009, his daughter Noa Netanyahu-Roth (married to Daniel Roth) gave birth to a boy, Shmuel. In 2011, Noa and her husband Daniel had a second son named David, and in 2016 had a daughter. Noa is a baalat teshuva (someone born to a secular family who returned to Orthodox Judaism) and lives in Mea Shearim with her family.

Relations with foreign leaders 

Netanyahu has a close relationship with Hungarian prime minister Viktor Orbán, their having known each other for decades due to the privileged relationship between the Likud Party and the EPP, the European People's Party. Orban particularly admired Netanyahu while he was working as Finance Minister, and received advice from him while Netanyahu was Finance Minister of Israel.

Netanyahu has been noted for his close and friendly relationship with then Italian prime minister Silvio Berlusconi. Netanyahu has said of Berlusconi: "We are lucky that there is a leader such as yourself." Netanyahu has described Berlusconi as "one of the greatest friends".

Netanyahu has a warm relationship with Russian President Vladimir Putin, touting their "personal friendship" in April 2019.

During the 2011 G-20 Cannes summit, then-French president Nicolas Sarkozy was overheard saying to then-U.S. President Barack Obama, "I cannot bear Netanyahu, he's a liar", and Obama reportedly responded, "You're fed up with him, but I have to deal with him every day."

Netanyahu and former U.S. President Donald Trump have known each other for many years. Netanyahu had been a friend of Donald Trump's father, Fred, when Netanyahu lived in New York during the 1980s, serving as UN ambassador. In 2013, Trump made a video endorsing Netanyahu during the Israeli elections saying, "vote for Benjamin – terrific guy, terrific leader, great for Israel". In June 2019, Netanyahu officially renamed a settlement in the disputed Golan Heights after Donald Trump. However, Trump aide Jared Kushner has claimed that in January 2020, Trump became frustrated with Netanyahu's rhetoric regarding annexation of the Jordan Valley, and considered endorsing his political opponent, Benny Gantz. Following Netanyahu's congratulations for Joe Biden after the 2020 U.S. presidential election, the relationship deteriorated, with Trump accusing him of disloyalty and stating Netanyahu had "made a terrible mistake".

Netanyahu has close ties with the congressional leadership of the U.S. Republican Party and with its 2012 presidential candidate, Mitt Romney. He and Romney first became acquainted when both worked at the Boston Consulting Group in the mid-1970s. U.S. President Joe Biden, a Democrat, has been friendly with Netanyahu for many years. In November 2011 and in the 2012 U.S. vice presidential debate, Biden stated that the relationship has lasted for 39 years. In March 2010, Netanyahu remarked during a joint statement with Biden during his visit of Israel that their friendship had started almost three decades prior.

In October 2014, author Jeffrey Goldberg related a conversation in which Goldberg said that a senior official of the Obama administration called Netanyahu a "chickenshit" after Netanyahu accused U.S. President Barack Obama of "acting contrary to American values". Goldberg went on to say that Netanyahu and his cabinet were largely to blame for the tensions between the Netanyahu and Obama governments. Secretary of State John Kerry phoned Netanyahu to clarify that "such statements are disgraceful, unacceptable and damaging" and "do not reflect the position of the United States". Netanyahu responded by saying "I'm being attacked because of my determination to defend Israel's interests. The safety of Israel is not important to those who attack me anonymously and personally." Because of evident rifts between Netanyahu and members of the Obama administration, observers have characterized the relationship as having reached a crisis level by October 2014. The relationship between Netanyahu and the Obama administration had become problematic enough that Goldberg reported in November 2014 that his conversations with Netanyahu and other Israeli officials indicated that Israel would wait until a new U.S. president is elected before attempting to repair the relationship with the White House. According to Alon Pinkas, a former diplomat and adviser to Israeli prime ministers, "Netanyahu's self-righteousness that this resolution is going to be changed or reversed by Trump is totally unfounded."

On 23 December 2016, the United Nations Security Council passed a resolution calling for an end to Israeli settlements. In a departure from longstanding American policy, the U.S. abstained from the vote and did not exercise its veto power. At the behest of the Netanyahu government, President-elect Trump attempted to intercede by publicly advocating for the resolution to be vetoed, as well as successfully persuading Egypt's Abdel Fattah el-Sisi to temporarily withdraw it from consideration. The resolution was then "proposed again by Malaysia, New Zealand, Senegal and Venezuela" – and passed 14 to 0. Netanyahu's office alleged that "the Obama administration not only failed to protect Israel against this gang-up at the UN, it colluded with it behind the scenes", adding: "Israel looks forward to working with President-elect Trump and with all our friends in Congress, Republicans and Democrats alike, to negate the harmful effects of this absurd resolution."

In early 2018, the Polish parliament adopted a new Polish law criminalizing suggestions that Poles were collectively complicit in Holocaust-related or other war crimes that had been committed during World War II by the Axis powers. Later that year at the Munich Security Conference, Polish prime minister Mateusz Morawiecki said "it is not going to be seen as criminal to say that there were Polish perpetrators, as there were Jewish perpetrators ... not only German perpetrators" implicated in the Jewish Holocaust. Netanyahu called his Polish counterpart's comment "outrageous" for saying that Jews had been among the Holocaust's perpetrators. The resulting crisis in Israel–Poland relations was resolved in late June that year when the two prime ministers issued a joint communiqué endorsing research into the Jewish Holocaust and condemning the misnomer "Polish concentration camps".

According to Efraim Zuroff of the Simon Wiesenthal Center, during the visit of Ukrainian President Petro Poroshenko in Jerusalem, Netanyahu failed to publicly address Ukraine's official policy of rehabilitating local Nazi collaborators like UPA leader Roman Shukhevych, who had participated in the murder of Jews.

Netanyahu has developed a close relationship with Brazilian President Jair Bolsonaro following Bolsonaro's election in 2018.

Netanyahu and Turkish President Recep Tayyip Erdoğan have tense relations. In March 2019, after being denounced by Turkey as a racist for saying that Israel was the nation-state of the Jewish people only, Netanyahu called Erdoğan a dictator and mocked him for imprisoning journalists in a tweet. In response, Erdoğan called Netanyahu as "the thief who heads Israel", referencing the ongoing corruption scandals against Netanyahu. In the same speech, Erdoğan further escalated the spat by addressing to Netanyahu directly, saying, "you are a tyrant. You are a tyrant who slaughters 7-year-old Palestinian kids", and further in April 2018, calling Israel "terror state" and Netanyahu "terrorist". Netanyahu tweeted that "Erdoğan is among Hamas's biggest supporters and there is no doubt that he well understands terrorism and slaughter." Netanyahu condemned the 2019 Turkish offensive into north-eastern Syria and warned against ethnic cleansing of Kurds by Turkey and its proxies.

Authored books

See also 
 Forbes list of The World's Most Powerful People
 List of international prime ministerial trips made by Benjamin Netanyahu
 List of Israeli politicians
 List of Massachusetts Institute of Technology alumni

References

Further reading
 Caspit, Ben. The Netanyahu Years (2017) excerpt
Medzini, Meron. "Rabin and Hussein: From Enemies at War to Partners in Peace." in The Palgrave Handbook of the Hashemite Kingdom of Jordan (Palgrave Macmillan, 2019) pp. 435–446.
 Anshel Pfeffer (2018). Bibi: The Turbulent Life and Times of Benjamin Netanyahu, Basic Books. 
 Jonathan Freedland, "Trump's Chaver in Jerusalem" (review of Anshel Pfeffer, Bibi: The Turbulent Life and Times of Benjamin Netanyahu, Basic Books, 2018), New York Review of Books, vol. LXV, no 13 (16 August 2018), pp. 32–34.
 Adam Shatz, "The sea is the same sea" (review of Anshel Pfeffer, Bibi: The Turbulent Life and Times of Benjamin Netanyahu, Hurst, May 2018), London Review of Books, vol. 40, no. 16 (30 August 2018), pp. 24, 26–28.

External links

 
 
 
 
 
 Benjamin Netanyahu collected news and commentary at The Jerusalem Post
 Benjamin Netanyahu collected news and commentary at Haaretz
 

 
1949 births
Living people
Benjamin
20th-century diplomats
20th-century Israeli male writers
20th-century non-fiction writers
20th-century Sephardi Jews
21st-century diplomats
21st-century Sephardi Jews
Articles containing video clips
Boston Consulting Group people
Chief marketing officers
Ministers of Communications of Israel
Deputy ministers of Israel
Israeli business executives
Israeli Ashkenazi Jews
Israeli management consultants
Israeli people of Belarusian-Jewish descent
Israeli people of Lithuanian-Jewish descent
Israeli people of Polish-Jewish descent
Israeli people of the Yom Kippur War
Israeli political writers
Israeli soldiers
Jewish Israeli politicians
Jewish Israeli writers
Jewish military personnel
Jewish non-fiction writers
Leaders of the Opposition (Israel)
Leaders of political parties in Israel
Likud leaders
Likud politicians
MIT School of Architecture and Planning alumni
Members of the 12th Knesset (1988–1992)
Members of the 13th Knesset (1992–1996)
Members of the 14th Knesset (1996–1999)
Members of the 15th Knesset (1999–2003)
Members of the 16th Knesset (2003–2006)
Members of the 17th Knesset (2006–2009)
Members of the 18th Knesset (2009–2013)
Members of the 19th Knesset (2013–2015)
Members of the 20th Knesset (2015–2019)
Members of the 21st Knesset (2019)
Members of the 22nd Knesset (2019–2020)
Members of the 23rd Knesset (2020–2021)
Members of the 24th Knesset (2021–2022)
Ministers of Finance of Israel
Ministers of Foreign Affairs of Israel
Ministers of Health of Israel
Ministers of Justice of Israel
MIT Sloan School of Management alumni
People from Cheltenham, Pennsylvania
Politicians from Jerusalem
Politicians from Tel Aviv
People of the Military Intelligence Directorate (Israel)
Permanent Representatives of Israel to the United Nations
Prime Ministers of Israel
Secular Jews
Writers on Zionism
Male non-fiction writers
Members of the 25th Knesset (2022–)